Goniodoma is a genus of moths, belonging to the family Coleophoridae.

Species
Goniodoma auroguttella Zeller, 1849
Goniodoma limoniella (Stainton, 1884)
Goniodoma millierella Ragonot, 1882
Goniodoma nemesi Capuse, 1970
Goniodoma sinica Li & Zheng, 2002

References

Coleophoridae